Unrein is a surname. Some notable persons with the name include:

 Martin Unrein (1901–1972), a general of the German Army during World War II
 Mitch Unrein, (born 1987), an American football player
 Scott Unrein (born 1976), an American composer and is producer/host (since March 2006) of the blog and podcast NonPop
 Sergio Unrein (born 1991), an Argentine footballer
 Terry Unrein (born 1962), a former American football player

See also
 Unrein, the fifth studio album by the German band Oomph!